The 2009 Liberty Flames football team represented Liberty University in the 2009 NCAA Division I FCS football season a member of the Big South Conference. The Flames were led by fourth-year head coach Danny Rocco and played their home games at Williams Stadium in Lynchburg, Virginia. They finished the season with an overall record of 8–3 and a 5–1 mark in the Big South to share the conference championship with Stony Brook.

Schedule

References

Liberty
Liberty Flames football seasons
Big South Conference football champion seasons
Liberty Flames football